Stella, l’amie de Maimie is a social justice and a community-based organization established and run “by and for” sex workers in Montreal. Also known as "Chez Stella", this community-based resource offers information for any woman-identified sex worker; be they street workers, escorts, strippers, employees of massage parlors, porn actresses, erotic phone entertainers.

Presentation of the organization

“Stella, l’amie de Maimie” is the only community group in Montreal that works exclusively and specifically with sex workers. Founded in 1995, “by and for” community organization has the goal of improving the life and work conditions of all women-identified sex workers in Montreal. Their programs also promote good health practices and the respect for the human rights of sex workers. The organization encourages empowerment and solidarity by and amongst sex workers, which means that all its actions favour the individual and collective responsibility of these sex workers.  Stella serves all kinds of sex workers and maintains an ongoing presence in sex work venues, including streets, escort agencies, massage parlors and strip bars.

The organization initially started with a founding board of four employees, and a dedicated group of volunteers and sympathizers. There is no specific religious affiliation within this organization. Stella participants are active on a number of committees, coalitions, research groups and boards of directors. Stella representatives are often invited to give lectures at conferences highlighting issues related to sex work.  The organization is also regularly invited to participate in artistic projects and events in Montreal. For example, in 2001, Stella took part in "Six personnages en quête d'auteur", a play directed by Wajdi Mouawad at the Théâtre de Quatre’sous.”

Stella works at the municipal, provincial and national level to promote sex workers’ rights, but also at the international level where it has affiliated with sex worker rights groups all over the world to fight for the same cause—the decriminalization of sex work. As explained in the “Dear Client” guide, one of the most asked question is “Why do sex workers do sex work?” The answer given by the organization Stella is “Sex work is work: an activity that generates income. Sex workers work first and foremost for money”.

History of the organization
Stella was born in 1995 after the work of a consultative committee set up by the AIDS Study Center in collaboration with the AQTTS, (L’association Québécoise des travailleuses et travailleurs du sexe), some community-based organization representatives (Centre-ville et Centre-Sud de Montréal) and doctors in epidemiology. The sex workers involved in the committee's work on HIV prevention suggested that the best way to reduce HIV is to improve the life conditions and work conditions of sex workers.

To that end, Stella opened its doors in April 1995 to specifically support cisgender and transgender women working in the sex industry, including street workers, escorts, porn actress, erotic dancers, etc. Stella set up a participative structure where women current or former sex workers would have a major input at every level of the organization - as volunteers, as members of the administration council or just a member of the working team. Stella acknowledges that their knowledge and experience are invaluable for developing actions and its tools that best suit the specific needs of all sex workers.

Objectives
According to their website, the main goals of Stella are:
 To counteract violence done to sex workers and the different factors that gets them to be infected with HIV and STIs, that threats their physical integrity;
 To fight discrimination, isolation and the stigmatization lived by the sex workers;
 To promote the decriminalization of the different kinds of sex works;
 To provide support and information to sex-workers so that they may live in safety and with dignity;
 To sensitize and educate the public about sex work and the realities faced by sex workers;
 To encourage and support the participation of sex workers to the community and in the making of collective actions;
 To favour the creation of exchange platforms on the sex work, at the municipal, provincial, national and international level.

Stella favors empowerment and solidarity by and amongst sex workers, since the organization's worldview is that all sex workers internationally are committed to the idea that each of them has a place in society, and human rights worth defending.

Current activities
Stella is an ongoing organization that works in different levels of the society to promote some new understanding of the sex industry for sex workers and for the general public. It goes from helping sex workers to fight hepatitis or HIV, to publishing magazines, doing workshop for students or sex workers, working with the government for the decriminalization of the sex industry in Montreal and internationally to helping sex workers to get some work experience within a social justice organization.

	The current activities are divided in two different sections: (1) Information and (2) Outreach. The following offers only a summary of each. For more details about the extensive activities of Stella visit their website. Chez Stella

1. Information
Stella has a number of activities that are focused on welcoming, supporting and informing the sex workers. All of these are available through a number of community-based organizations situated in the hot spots for street prostitution in Montreal. Services include:
	phone line,
	drop in community meals
	Medical clinics (2X per month in collaboration with Medecin du Monde, tracking, vaccination hepatitis A and B, gynecologists, etc...)
	free vaccination clinics for hepatitis A and B in bars and detentions building
	legal clinics at Stella's offices
	Visits to sex workers in prison.
	programs of educative and community activities at Stella's locals

Stella also provides sex workers with support through the judicial process, social services and health services.

2. Outreach
Stella supports a number of outreach programs that go out into the environment where sex workers live and work. For example:
	the districts where there is a concentration of street prostitution;
	hotels and bars where the prostitutes or escorts recruit/bring their clients;
	bars with erotic dancers;
	restaurants and coffee shops where the sex workers take their breaks;
	escorts agencies, massage parlors, and the sex workers' apartment where they receive the clients;
	the places where the prostitutes toxicomans squat;
	pornographic film set,
	the incarceration buildings (federals and provincials)

Goals of Outreach
	To train volunteers (the majority being sex workers) about the individual and collective responsibility of sex workers;
	To mobilize sex workers for collective action efforts (actions, Forum XXX, International AIDS Conferences, etc.);
	To research and to analyze sex worker activities especially HIV/AIDS prevention efforts (this program is in collaboration with university and community partners);
	To circulate study results;
	To create workshops to education outreach workers, social workers and anyone in the general public who works with sex workers about sex workers' realities ;

Bad Tricks List
Another brilliant and useful activity done by this social justice organization is the “Bad Tricks and Assaulters Lists”. It is a list given by sex workers to share the knowledge of dangerous people that might be in certain districts. This list is very useful for the sex workers and is published in the monthly bulletin and in the bi-yearly magazine called ConStellation.

Publications
Stella prepares a number of publications of interest to sex workers including:
	Constellation a free magazine for sex workers
	Bulletin Stellaire
	Hepatitis C brochure
	Clients guide
	violence prevention brochure
	Guide XXX
	Striptease guide
Stella also manages a website with all resources available electronically. All publications are bilingual and the Hepatitis C and the clients' guide are trilingual (French, English and Inuktitut).

	As an example of its usage here is a part of the latest ConStellation's editorial magazine. “By taking the initiative to produce a ConStellation that addresses the 7 major sectors of the sex industry through interviews with women who work in the pornography, erotic massage, street prostitution, domination, webcam, erotic dancing and the world of escorts, the Stella team has killed two birds with one stone. In addition to giving us a chance to share our knowledge about business and providing us with the opportunity to learn from each other, this ConStellation also presents a faithful portrait of the sex industry, with all that this implies, in North America today.”   This proves an example of the use and the importance of these publications; to inform the general public and the sex workers from the sex industry about good tips, and share their experience of this sometimes challenging job.

Public Outreach
The last part of Stella's work for the improvement of the sex workers' lives is more focused on the sensitizing of the general public and the interveners from the health care system and the social services as much as the policemen and policewomen to the problems and the realities and the preoccupations that the sex workers may have. For example, this sensitizing could be done through meetings with students or interested groups that want to have more information, by holding an information desk in major conferences or forums or to have a public conference or many more public activities. It could also be by the writing of activity reports or community media mass articles.

This social justice organization also does a lot of information work of sensitizing to the shop owners, the people living in hot areas to participate actively in the different conversation tables of the districts and the group of organizations by themes.

All of these services are offered by employee and volunteer teams composed mostly by either sex-workers or ex sex-workers.

Current Organizational Features
As explained in the introduction, Stella started with only four employers and many volunteers; today on average twelve women work full-time for Stella and the membership continues to grow. There are many volunteers and sympathizers helping to write articles, draw the pictures for the publication, some also provide names for the List of assaults and many of the volunteers work on the streets (outreach) to help other sex workers.

The main team is formed of a president, a vice president, a treasurer, person-resource, administrators, outreach coordinator, outreach workers, clerk-receptionist, general coordinator, project officer, speakers and accounting.

Funding for Stella activities comes from donations and fundraising efforts with project support from provincial, municipal and private bodies.

Organization Website
Chez Stella, l'amie de Maimie

References

External links
Global Alliance Against Trafficking in Women
Network of Sex Work Projects
 Sex workers present on blip.tv
Laura Agustín : Border Thinking on Migration, Trafficking and Commercial Sex
Paulo Longo Research Initiative
Liste de discussion internationale TDS francophones
Sex Trade Workers Industrial Union 690 (Industrial Workers of the World)
Sex Worker Media Librar
International Sex Work Foundation for Art, Culture and Education

Bibliography
Stella, l’amie de Maimie. 2009. Editorial. Constellation, Special Working Conditions, April 10. (Available online: http://www.chezstella.org/stella/?q=en/constellation2009                     	(accessed February 20)).
Stella, l’amie de Maimie. 2004.  Dear Client, Manual intended for clients of                    	sex workers. Montréal.
Stella, l’amie de Maimie. 2009. Stella, l’amie de Maimie, official website.                        			http://www.chezstella.org/. (accessed February 13).
Tremblay, Francine. 2001. L’individu dans la modernité—Georges Herbert Mead,            		Charles Taylor and Alain Touraine. MA Thesis, Concordia University. (Available         	online : http://spectrum.library.concordia.ca/1521/1/MQ64034.pdf (accessed February 27)).

1995 establishments in Quebec
Organizations based in Montreal
Prostitution in Canada